Songs for Worship, Volume 1 is an album released by American Christian singer John Michael Talbot, released in 1982.

Track listing
All songs are written by John Michael Talbot.

Side A
 Our Blessing Cup - (4:20)
 Glory to God - (3:47)
 I Rejoiced When I Heard Them Say (Psalm 122) - (3:23)
 Holy, Holy, Holy - (2:16)
 Lamb of God - (2:23)
 I Am the Bread of Life - (4:14)

Side B
 Forever Will I Sing (Psalm 89) - (2:21)
 I Am the Vine - (4:28)
 Psalm 42 (Like a Deer) - (5:23)
 Give Thanks to the Lord (Psalm 107) - 4:00
 I Am the Good Shepherd (Psalm 23) - 4:17

Personnel
 John Michael Talbot - lead vocals
 Background vocals - Stephen W. Amerson, Kingdom Come Choir

Production
 Associate producers - John Michael Talbot and Phil Perkins
 Arranged by Phil Perkins
 Engineers - Darrell Powell, Wally Grant
 Mastered at Future Disc Systems by Steve Hall with Ken Pennell

External links
 Songs for Worship, Volume 1 at Discogs

1982 albums